Mucia Tertia ( 79–31 BC) was a Roman matrona who lived in the 1st century BC. She was the daughter of Quintus Mucius Scaevola, the pontifex maximus and consul in 95 BC.

Around 79 BC, Mucia married Pompey, a leading and soon-to-be dominant figure in Roman politics. She was the mother of all three of Pompey's known children. Pompey divorced her in 61 BC, either for adultery or for political reasons. She subsequently married Marcus Aemilius Scaurus and remained active in Roman politics, leading peace talks between her son Sextus Pompey and Octavian in 39 BC and maintaining a relationship of mutual respect with Octavian in the years that followed.

Early life
Mucia's mother was closely related to Cato the Younger but is otherwise uncertain, she may have been Licinia who divorced her father to marry Quintus Caecilius Metellus Nepos, in a scandal mentioned by several sources. Her name, Mucia Tertia, would suggest that she was a third daughter, according to the Roman naming convention for women, though it is believed that the choice of name was to differentiate her from her two aunts. If her mother was Licinia then Mucia had also two younger half-brothers from her mother's second marriage, Quintus Metellus Celer, consul in 60 BC, and Quintus Metellus Nepos, consul in 57.

During her father's time as governor of the province of Asia in 95–94 BC, a statue in his honour was erected at Olympia. There is some evidence that a further statue was erected to his wife or daughter which, if it were indeed dedicated to Mucia, would make her the first woman to receive this honour, which later became usual for members of the imperial household.

Marriages
Mucia was possibly first married to Gaius Marius the Younger, consul in 82 BC, at a very young age. This was a time of civil war between the Marian regime at Rome and Lucius Cornelius Sulla. Following his defeat the Younger Marius committed suicide; if the marriage had gone ahead, this would have left Mucia a childless widow.

Following the victory of Lucius Cornelius Sulla over Gaius Marius the Younger, Sulla, as Dictator, needed to secure Pompey's loyalty and to do that, he arranged the latter's marriage to Mucia around 79 BC. This marriage resulted in three children: elder son Gnaeus Pompeius, daughter Pompeia Magna (who married Faustus Cornelius Sulla) and younger son Sextus Pompey. She outlived all three of her children.

Between 76 and 61, Pompey spent most of the time away from Rome, campaigning in Hispania against Sertorius, in the Mediterranean Sea against the pirates, and in the East fighting King Mithridates VI of Pontus. On his return in 61, Pompey sent Mucia a letter of divorce. According to Cicero's personal correspondence, the motive was adultery (it is said that she was one of Julius Caesar's many affairs, although Pompey's friendship and alliance with Caesar at the time could suggest that Pompey himself either did not regard this rumour as true or did not consider it important). The imperial biographer Suetonius stated that Pompey often referred to Caesar as 'Aegisthus', the name of a Greek mythological character who was known to have seduced a king's wife. Mucia next married Marcus Aemilius Scaurus, a stepson of the dictator Sulla, with whom she had another son named Marcus. In 39 BC Mucia, at the earnest request of the Roman people, went to Sicily to mediate between her son Sextus Pompey and triumvir Octavian (the future Emperor, Augustus). This made her the first Roman woman recorded as fulfilling an official diplomatic role.

Mucia was alive at the time of the Battle of Actium in 31 BC, though her date of death is unknown. Octavian treated her with great respect.

See also
 Mucia gens

Footnotes

Explanatory notes

References

Sources

Primary sources

Asconius, Pro Scauro, p. 19, Orelli-Baiter (ed.) (1845).
Cicero, Epistulae ad Familiares, v, 2.
Cicero, Epistulae ad Atticum, i. 12.
Dio Cassius, xxxvii. 49, xlviii, 16, li. 2, lvi. 38.
Appian, Bellum Civile v. 69, 72.
Suetonius, Life of Julius Caesar, 50.
Plutarch, Life of Pompey, 42.
Zonaras, x. 5.
Hieronymus, Adversus Jovinianum, i. 48.

Modern scholarship

 
 
 
 
 
 

1st-century BC Roman women
1st-century BC Romans
Mistresses of Julius Caesar
Tertia
Wives of Pompey
Year of birth missing
Year of death unknown